Maria del Carmen Arroyo is the former Council member for the 17th district of the New York City Council.  She is a Democrat.

The district includes Belmont, Claremont Village, Clason Point, Concourse, Concourse Village, Crotona Park East, Hunts Point, Longwood, Melrose, Morrisania, Mott Haven, North Brother Island, Parkchester, Port Morris, Soundview, South Brother Island, Tremont and West Farms in The Bronx.

Life and career
Arroyo was born Corozal, Puerto Rico, and moved to The Bronx with her family when she was seven years old. She is the daughter of Assemblywoman Carmen E. Arroyo. In her childhood, Arroyo attended P.S. 154 in the South Bronx, Junior High School in Harlem and two years of high school at Washington Irving High School in Manhattan before dropping out to assist her family financially by working full-time. She wouldn't earn her GED until she was twenty years old.

Following working as a receptionist, she enrolled at Hostos Community College, Obtain an Bachelor of Arts degree from the College of New Rochelle in 1980 at the age of 44. [This last sentence does not make sense. Arroyo's mother, Carmen E. Arroyo, was born in 1936, making the latter 44 years old in 1980, not her daughter, the subject of this entry.] She then served as Executive Director at Segundo Ruiz Belvis D & TC before working as Senior Director of Operations for the Narco Freedom, Inc, and then as volunteer Executive Director of the South Bronx Community Corporation.

Over the years, Arroyo has come under fire for issues surrounding gambling.

NY State Assemblywoman Carmen Arroyo has been sued by the state Board of Elections 21 times since 2006 for failing to file her campaign finances. The nondisclosure is a violation of state election laws that often results in heavy fines, but little else. Arroyo has an established record of ignoring the deadlines. [No reference for this last sentence, making it seem like opinion than researched and referenced fact.]

The Board of Elections has sued the lawmaker 21 times since 2006 — for a total of $12,700 — for failing to file campaign financial disclosures. It is speculated that her failure to report is due to misappropriation of campaign funds in connection to gambling. In 2013, it was found that individuals who worked on Arroyo's campaign in 2013 had forged petition signatures for ballot access in her reelection to council. Arroyo also came under fire for paying her son over $55,000 from her campaign account for a part-time advisory role.

New York City Council
Arroyo won the special election for her council seat in 2005 after her predecessor, Jose M. Serrano, jumped to the New York State Senate. She easily won election to a full term in 2005, and reelection in 2009 and 2013.

In 2013, it was found that individuals who worked on Arroyo's campaign in 2013 had forged petition signatures for ballot access in her reelection to council. Arroyo also came under fire for paying her son over $55,000 from her campaign account for a part-time advisory role.

References

External links
Councilwoman Maria del Carmen Arroyo (official Council site)

College of New Rochelle alumni
Hispanic and Latino American women in politics
American politicians of Puerto Rican descent
Living people
Lehman College alumni
New York City Council members
New York (state) Democrats
Politicians from the Bronx
People from Corozal, Puerto Rico
Women New York City Council members
21st-century American politicians
21st-century American women politicians
Year of birth missing (living people)
Hispanic and Latino American New York City Council members